Jonathan Bar Giora (born 8 July 1962) is an Israeli composer and pianist. Since 2000, Bar Giora has composed scores and soundtracks for Israeli films such as Bonjour Monsieur Shlomi, Time of Favor, A Quiet Heart and Aviva, My Love. He also worked as a composer with Israeli actors such as Yossi Banai, Rita and Rickie Gal. Bar Giora lectures at the Sapir Academic College and at Maale Film School.

During the years 2011-2015 he managed the division for film music and sound design in the School of Audio & Visual Arts at Sapir Academic College, where he continues teaching as a senior lecturer. He also teaches at Beit Berl College and in Ma'aleh School of Television, Film and the Arts.

His composition style presents diverse influences, from Mizrahi music, Jazz, Classical music, Rock music to Electronic music.

He has collaborated with various Israeli musicians, such as Meir Banai, Riki Gal, Haïm Ulliel, Miri Mesika, Yehonatan Geffen, Orli Perl and Eli Louzon.

Biography
Jonathan Bar Giora was born in Jerusalem, Israel, in 1962. When he was 16, he left high school and started playing in local piano bars. All through the 1980s he played jazz and wrote music-related articles for the local press. In 1990 he staged a one-man show I'd be delighted to meet you after the plague, which he wrote, composed and performed (Director: Shlomo Vazana). A secondary character in that show, Michel Clayderlast, became successful when Bar Giora created "Live Elevator Music". A performance-art show debuted at the 1990 Israel Festival, featuring Clayderlast playing 20-second bits of popular music live inside in elevator (20 seconds is the average time elevator users spend inside). In 1991 he staged Erua Mochi, a rock spectacle presenting a new musical style: "Live Acid". The band, led by Bar Giora, played looped music live in an attempt to reduce fears among live musicians, at a time when electronic and sampled music threatened to wipe all their job opportunities.
 
1992 was dedicated to Jesse's Carnival, a gloomy cabaret show with singer-songwriter Jonathan Licht.
 
In 1993, Bar Giora created a Fringe theatre show, Entebbe - The Musical with Etgar Keret. Bar Giora composed all of the songs and original score, and the show won first prize at Acco Festival of Alternative Israeli Theatre. The rest of the 90s were dedicated to theater music, TV work (musical director of Ad Eser, a weekly talk show with Merav Michaeli, music for Meni Peer's TV show, and many others). In 1999 he wrote the music for Pgisha Leiyn Kets, a special CD dedicated to the poetry of Nathan Alterman, read by one Israel's leading actors Yossi Banai. That same year he composed Joseph Cedar's feature film Time of Favor. It was a first in a series of more than 150 movie scores (TV dramas and documentaries included)he composed from 2000 on. In August 2018 the Tel Aviv, Jerusalem & Haifa Cinematheques held a special tribute to his work for films and television.

On August 2018 Helicon released the album Themes (in Hebrew: "תֵּמוֹת"), the first anthology of music composed by Bar Giora for films.

Early in 2020 the Israeli Andalusian Orchestra dedicated a concert to Bar Giora's works titled "Soundtrack of the Heart" (in Hebrew: "פסקול הלב"). That same year Bar Giora won The Israeli Documentary Filmmakers Forum Award for best score for "Spotting Yossi" (In Hebrew להאיר את יוסי).

Selected works

Music Albums
Endless Meeting - Yossi Banai Reads Alterman, 1999
Slowly - Yossi Banai, 2001
Yossi Banai Reads Psalms, 2005
Yehonatan Geffen - Saying Love Songs, 2009
Endless Meeting - Yossi Banai Reads Alterman, 2010 - A new release, re-mixed with three additional never-before-released tracks
Themes - First Anthology of Movie Soundtracks, 2018
Bonjour Monsieur Shlomi - The Soundtrack, 2003
Aviva, My Love - The Soundtrack, 2006
Bringing the Fairies Back - Collaboration with Shez, 2020
Spotting Yossi - The Soundtrack, 2020
Queen Shoshana - Soundtrack album, 2022
Middle Eastern Soul Second film scores compilation, 2022

Original Music for Video-Art and Musical Works
Closed Circuit - Created by Miri Segal. Also shown at Museum of Modern Art (MoMA), New-York, 2000
EG - Created by Miri Segal. Tel Aviv Museum of Art, 2000
fORESHADOWIN - Created by Miri Segal. Also shown at Museum of Modern Art (MoMA), New-York, 2001
Human/Adam Temple - Music for a permanent display, Tel Aviv Museum of Art
PIXEL TOUCH - Created by Jonathan Bar Giora and Miri Segal. First shown at the Viral Festival, 2020

References

External links
 Official Site

 YouTube Channel
 Original Soundtrack for Bonjour Monsieur Shlomi
 Original Soundtrack for Aviva, My Love
 "To Bring Back The Fairies" ("להחזיר את הפיות") with poet Shez.
 Original Soundtrack for "Cinema: A Public Affair".

Israeli composers
Israeli pianists
Living people
1962 births
People from Jerusalem
Academic staff of Sapir Academic College